The Amos and Lillie Plummer House in Hillsboro, North Dakota, now also known as the Traill County Historical Society Museum, was built in 1897.   It was listed on the National Register of Historic Places in 1996.

History
It is a Queen Anne style house designed by John W. Ross.  Amos L. Plummer (1836-1903) operated a general store and  also farmed land in Traill County, North Dakota. In 1886, Plummer  married  Lillie Wilson (1860-1911). They established a bank and other businesses in Hillsboro.  In 1894, Plummer  was elected mayor of Hillsboro.

In 1965, the former Plummer residence  was donated to the  Traill County Historical Society in 1965 by the Daughters of Dakota Pioneers. It is now operated as the Traill County Historical Society Museum.

References

External links
 Trail County Museum 
Traill County Historical Society 

Houses on the National Register of Historic Places in North Dakota
Queen Anne architecture in North Dakota
Houses completed in 1897
Museums in Traill County, North Dakota
History museums in North Dakota
Houses in Traill County, North Dakota
National Register of Historic Places in Traill County, North Dakota
1897 establishments in North Dakota